Andrew Waters may refer to:

Andy Waters, chef who worked with Andreas Antona
Andrew Waters (mixed martial artist) in Strikeforce Challengers: Woodley vs. Bears

See also
Andrew Walters (disambiguation)